Mária Mračnová (née Faithová; born 24 September 1946) is a Slovak athlete. She competed in the women's high jump at the 1968 Summer Olympics and the 1976 Summer Olympics.

References

1946 births
Living people
Athletes (track and field) at the 1968 Summer Olympics
Athletes (track and field) at the 1976 Summer Olympics
Slovak female high jumpers
Olympic athletes of Czechoslovakia
Sportspeople from Košice